Zhongshan Sports Center Stadium (Simplified Chinese: 中山体育中心体育场) is a multi-use stadium in Zhongshan, Guangdong, China.  It is currently used mostly for association football matches and was one of the six stadiums used for the 1991 FIFA Women's World Cup. The stadium has a capacity of 12,000 people. The stadium are all-seaters with multi-colour seats. It also has an all-weather track and field surface.

Concerts are also held there with acts from Hong Kong and from regional Guangzhou capital city. Unusual for concertgoers, is that a platform is set up in one end towards the centerline and the stage is just slightly higher than temporary seats, which are also on the platform.

References 

Football venues in China
1991 FIFA Women's World Cup stadiums
Sports venues in Guangdong